C.D. Liberal are a Salvadoran professional football club based in Quelepa, San Miguel, El Salvador.

In 2015, Brasilia were relegated to the Salvadoran Third Division.

Honours

Domestic honours
 Segunda División Salvadorean and predecessors 
 Champions (1) : TBD
 Tercera División Salvadorean and predecessors 
 Champions:(1) : Apertura 2017

Current squad
As of 2018:

Notable coaches
  Maximo Santana Orellana
  Juan Antonio Merlos
  Manuel de la Paz Palacios
  Marvin Bernal Silva (1984)
  Esteban Melara (1990)
  Omar Sevilla (2000)
  Salomón Quintanilla (−2002)
  Hermes Rodríguez (2002–)
  Salvador Coreas Privado (2003–2004)
  Eraldo Correia (2006)
  Omar Sevilla (2007)
  Esteban Melara (2008–2009)
  Miguel Angel Aguilar Obando (2008–09)
 Marvin Benítez "la Perica" (2010–2011)
 Nelson Mauricio Ancheta (Aug 2013 – Nov 2013)
 Víctor Coreas (Nov 2013–2014)
 Abel Blanco (Aug 2014 – Dec 2014)
 Salvador Coreas (Jan 2015–)
 Edwin Garay (Jan 2016–)
 José Héctor Bernal Silva (2017)
 Omar Sevilla (May 2018 – Nov 2018)
 Ervin Loza (Nov 2018 – Dec 2018)
 Salomón Quintanilla (Dec 2018– Feb 2019)
 Abel Blanco (Feb 2019–Oct 2019)
 Nelson Mauricio Ancheta (Oct 2019-Dec 2019)
 Denis Moreno (Jan 2020-)

External links
 C.d. liberal Más vale tarde... – Diario de Oriente 
 Liberal pretende ser protagonista – La Prensa Gráfica 

Football clubs in El Salvador
Association football clubs established in 1962
1962 establishments in El Salvador